James Manuel Costa  (born April 13, 1952) is an American politician serving as the U.S. representative for  since 2023, previously representing the 20th congressional district from 2005 to 2013 and the 16th congressional district from 2013 to 2023. A member of the Democratic Party, his district includes most of Fresno.

Costa served in the California State Assembly from 1978 to 1994 before he was elected to the California State Senate from 1994 until 2002. During his time in the California State Assembly, he served as Majority Caucus Chair. Costa, who chaired the Blue Dog Coalition in the U.S. House of Representatives, also chaired the Subcommittee on Livestock and Foreign Agriculture during the 117th Congress.

Early life and education

Born in Fresno, Costa is a third-generation family farmer. His grandparents emigrated from the Azores in the early 20th century. He graduated from San Joaquin Memorial High School (1970) and from Fresno State (1974), where he was a member of Sigma Alpha Epsilon and graduated with a bachelor's degree in political science. He worked as a Special Assistant to Congressman John Krebs (1975–76) and as Administrative Assistant to Assemblyman Rick Lehman (1976–78).

California legislature
Costa was elected to the California State Assembly in 1978. At the time of his election to the California State Legislature, he was the youngest member of the legislature at the age of 26. He represented part of Fresno County in the state legislature for 24 years, serving in the State Assembly (1978–1994) and the State Senate (1994–2002). He was a sponsor of the Costa-Hawkins Rental Housing Act, a bill signed into law in 1995 that prohibits rent control on single-family homes, condominiums, and any rental unit constructed after February 1, 1995.

U.S. House of Representatives

Elections

2004 

In 2004, Costa entered the Democratic primary for the 20th district, which was opened up by the retirement of its seven-term incumbent, Cal Dooley. Dooley endorsed his chief of staff, Lisa Quigley, as his successor, but most of the state's Democratic Party establishment, including Senator Dianne Feinstein, endorsed Costa, who won the bruising primary and faced Republican state senator Roy Ashburn in November.

The 20th district is a heavily Democratic, 63% Latino-majority district; it gave Al Gore his highest vote total outside the state's two large conurbations (Sacramento and the San Francisco Bay Area in the north and Los Angeles and San Diego to the south). Nonetheless, the Republicans spent a substantial amount of money on the race. Ashburn's campaign made plays on Costa's name ("Costa's going to cost ya") and linked him to former governor Gray Davis, calling them "two taxing twins". Costa won the election with 54% of the vote to Ashburn's 46%. Ashburn kept the margin within single digits by winning heavily Republican Kings County.

2006 

Costa ran unopposed for reelection in 2006. The Democrats won control of the House in that election, and Costa became chair of the Natural Resources Committee's Energy and Mineral Resources Subcommittee. He is a member of the House Agriculture Committee.

2008 

Costa was reelected in 2008 with 74% of the vote, the highest percentage for a Democratic incumbent outside Sacramento, the Bay Area, and Southern California.

2010 

Costa was challenged for reelection by Republican nominee Andy Vidak. In his closest race yet, the race was officially called for Costa nearly three weeks after election day, with the unofficial final tally standing at 45,806 votes (51.8%) for Costa and 42,773 (48.2%) for Vidak.

2012 

For his first four terms, Costa represented a district including most of the majority-Latino portions of Fresno and Bakersfield. Redistricting after the 2010 census renumbered his district as the 21st and made it slightly more Republican. In February 2012, Costa announced that he would run in the newly formed 16th district, a much more compact district that included most of Fresno as well as most of Merced. That district had previously been the 19th, represented by freshman Republican Jeff Denham. Denham's home had been drawn into the neighboring 10th district (formerly the 18th district), and he sought reelection there. While most of Costa's old territory remained in the 21st, the new 16th absorbed most of the old 20th's share of Fresno County, including his home.

Costa faced Republican Brian Whelan in the general election. After the new districts were announced, it was reported that the NRCC considered Costa vulnerable to defeat, but had the district existed in 2008, Barack Obama would have carried it with 57% of the vote.

In November 2011, the League of Conservation Voters ran a series of television ads in Costa's district criticizing his environmental record. Costa was reelected with 54% of the vote.

2014 

Costa faced an unexpectedly close race against Republican Johnny Tacherra, a dairy farmer from rural Fresno County. On election night, Tacherra led by 736 votes, a margin that grew to 1,772 a few days later. Tacherra's lead narrowed as counting continued, and Costa ultimately defeated him by 1,319 votes. While Tacherra carried the district's portions of Merced and Madera counties, Costa defeated him in Fresno County by 9,600 votes.

2016 

On June 7, 2016, Costa was the sole Democratic candidate in the 2016 "top two" primary, and was ahead on June 28, with 50,917 votes (55.9%). In the general election he again faced Tacherra, who had received 30,342 votes (33.1%). Costa was reelected with 58% of the vote to Tacherra's 42%.

2018 

On November 6, 2018, Costa defeated the only Republican candidate, Elizabeth Heng, in the "top two" primary, 53% to 47%. He was reelected in a Democratic "wave" in California, 57.5% to 42.5%.

2020 

Costa and Republican challenger Kevin Cookingham, a former Clovis Unified School District educator, advanced through the "top two" primary, besting two Democratic challengers. Costa then defeated Cookingham with 59.4% of the vote to Cookingham's 40.6%.

Committee assignments
Committee on Agriculture
Subcommittee on Livestock and Foreign Agriculture (Chair)
Committee on Natural Resources
Subcommittee on Water, Oceans and Wildlife
Committee on Foreign Affairs
Subcommittee on Europe, Energy, the Environment and Cyber

Caucus memberships
American Sikh Congressional Caucus
Congressional Armenian Caucus
Blue Dog Coalition (former Chair)
Congressional Crime Survivors and Justice Caucus (Co-founder and Chairman)
Congressional Hispanic Caucus
European Union Caucus
Congressional Fertilizer Caucus (Co-Chair)
House Gun Violence Prevention Task Force
Congressional Caucus on Hellenic Issues
Congressional India Caucus
Congressional LGBTQ+ Equality Caucus
New Democrat Coalition
Congressional Organ and Tissue Donation and Transplantation Awareness Caucus (Co-Chair) 
Problem Solvers Caucus
Congressional Rodeo Caucus (Co-Chair)
Taiwan Caucus
Transatlantic Legislators' Dialogue (Co-Chair)
Tom Lantos Human Rights Commission
Congressional Wine Caucus

Political positions

Abortion and Contraception

In 2020, Costa received a 100% rating from NARAL Pro-Choice America and has been endorsed by the Planned Parenthood Action Fund. Costa opposed the overturning of Roe v. Wade, saying, "this ruling strips women of their freedom to make their own decisions and the constitutional right to privacy." He is an original co-sponsor of the Women's Health Protection Act, which prohibits governmental restrictions on the provision of, and access to, abortion services nationwide. 

Additionally, Costa voted for H.R. 8373 ("The Right to Contraception Act"), which would create a statutory right for individuals to obtain contraceptives and engage in contraception. He also voted for the Ensuring Women’s Right to Reproductive Freedom Act, which would protect individuals crossing state lines who are seeking safe and legal reproductive healthcare, including those traveling with them, from criminal prosecution.

Agriculture
Costa co-sponsored the bipartisan Agricultural Certainty for Reporting Emissions (ACRE) Act. The act would strip provisions from Comprehensive Environmental Response, Compensation, and Liability Act (CERCLA), which was responsible for ensuring cleanup of industrial toxic waste dumps, oil spills, and chemical tank explosions environmental regulations on farmland. If enacted, the act would reduce transparency by protecting livestock farmers from changes to waste storage and disposal methods. Another provision would protect farmers from strict water laws, regulated under the Clean Water Act.

District of Columbia rights
Costa supports DC statehood. He was a co-sponsor and voted for H.R. 51 - Washington, D.C. Admission Act, which would grant statehood to the residential areas of the current District of Columbia as the State of Washington, Douglass Commonwealth.

On February 9, 2023, Costa, along with 30 other Democrats, voted with House Republicans to reject the Revised Criminal Code Act of 2022, passed by the Council of the District of Columbia.

Energy
In January 2015, Costa was one of 28 House Democrats to vote to build the Keystone XL pipeline.

Foreign affairs 
Costa was one of five House Democrats to voted to continue selling arms to Saudi Arabia and to support the Saudi Arabian-led intervention in Yemen.

Armenia–Azerbaijan conflict
Costa accused Turkey, a NATO member, of inciting the conflict between Armenia and Azerbaijan over the disputed region of Nagorno-Karabakh, saying, "Azerbaijan has continued to fuel this fire by failing to recognize the sovereignty of the Republic of Artsakh, while Turkey has helped enable this aggression." On October 1, 2020, he co-signed a letter to Secretary of State Mike Pompeo that condemned Azerbaijan's offensive operations against the Armenian-populated Republic of Artsakh, denounced Turkey's role in the Nagorno-Karabakh conflict and called for an immediate ceasefire.

Ukraine-Russia War
In February 2023, during the Russo-Ukrainian War, Costa signed a letter advocating for President Biden to give F-16 fighter jets to Ukraine.

U.S-China Relations

Health care
Costa was reportedly a holdout vote on the Patient Protection and Affordable Care Act, also known as Obamacare, in March 2010. He ultimately voted in favor of the legislation. To gain Costa's vote, the House leadership reportedly promised Costa and Dennis Cardoza funding for a medical school for California's Central Valley.

Immigration
Costa has continuously supported comprehensive immigration reform. He is an original co-sponsor of the American Dream and Promise Act, which provides a pathway to citizenship for Deferred Action for Childhood Arrivals (DACA) recipients. He was instrumental in crafting the bipartisan Farmworker Modernization Act, which would give undocumented farmworkers and their family members a path to legal immigration status.

Costa supports strong border security, and has voted to authorize funding for improved border security. He said, "Over my congressional career—through three presidents from both parties—I have continually voted to improve border security, including authorizing construction of physical barriers where appropriate."

Infrastructure and transportation

In August 2021, Costa joined a group of conservative Democrats, dubbed "The Unbreakable Nine", who threatened to derail the Biden administration's $3.5 trillion budget reconciliation package meant to tackle the nation's infrastructure.

High-speed rail
Costa has advocated creating a high-speed rail system that would go up and down California as well as across the nation at speeds of 225 miles per hour. He has introduced many bills supporting these rails; so far, none have passed. Miller compared rail projects to Eisenhower's highway expansion and pleaded to Transportation Secretary Ray LaHood and President Barack Obama for help in with this project.

In April 2008, Costa wrote a piece in Capitol Weekly calling for high-speed rail in California.

Military

National cemetery burials
In December 2017, Costa introduced legislation to allow some Hmong- and Laotian-American veterans to be buried in U.S. national cemeteries. The legislation applies to Hmong and Laotian veterans who fought alongside the U.S. against North Vietnamese forces in the 1960s and 1970s. The bill, which does not allow for burials at Arlington National Cemetery, applies only to veterans who pass away on or after the bill's enactment. The bill was enacted in March 2018 as part of the Consolidated Appropriations Act of 2018.

Honors
 Commander of the Order of Merit, Portugal (June 8, 1996)

References

External links

Congressman Jim Costa official U.S. House website
Jim Costa for Congress campaign website
 
 

|-

|-

|-

|-

|-

|-

|-

|-

1952 births
20th-century American politicians
21st-century American politicians
American people of Azorean descent
American people of Portuguese descent
Democratic Party California state senators
California State University, Fresno alumni
Living people
Democratic Party members of the California State Assembly
Democratic Party members of the United States House of Representatives from California
People from Fresno, California